Gus Johnson (November 15, 1913 – February 6, 2000) was an American swing drummer in various jazz bands, born in Tyler, Texas, United States. After learning to play drums from his next-door neighbor, Johnson occasionally played professionally at the age of ten in the Lincoln Theater, and performed in various local groups, most notable McDavid's Blue Rhythm Band. Upon graduating from Booker T. Washington High School, Johnson moved to Kansas City, where he took up drumming full-time. He joined Jay McShann's Orchestra in 1938, with his music career being interrupted by his conscription into the military in 1943.

In 1945, Johnson returned from his stint in the military, and relocated to Chicago to perform in the Jesse Miller Band. Johnson played on Willie Dixon's debut album, Willie's Blues. He subsequently played alongside Count Basie, and was recorded on the album, Basie Rides Again, in 1952. Following a recovery from appendicitis, Johnson was featured in numerous groups and dozens of recordings in the 1960s. In 1972, his former bandmates from Jay McShann's Orchestra reconvened to record Going to Kansas City. Although Johnson continued to tour into the 1980s, he developed Alzheimer's disease in 1989, which he struggled with until his death on February 6, 2000.

Discography
With Manny Albam
The Drum Suite (RCA Victor, 1956) with Ernie Wilkins
Jazz Goes to the Movies (Impulse!, 1962)
With Count Basie
The Count! (Clef, 1952 [1955])
Basie Jazz (Clef, 1952 [1954])
Dance Session (Clef, 1953)
Dance Session Album#2 (Clef, 1954)
Basie (Clef, 1954)
The Count Basie Story (Roulette, 1960)
 Get Together (Pablo, 1979)
With Lawrence Brown
Inspired Abandon (Impulse!, 1965)
With Ray Bryant
Dancing the Big Twist (Columbia, 1961)
With Buck Clayton
Buck & Buddy Blow the Blues (Swingville, 1961) with Buddy Tate
Jam Session (Chiaroscuro, 1974)
With Al Cohn
Son of Drum Suite (RCA Victor, 1960)
Either Way (Fred Miles Presents, 1961) with Zoot Sims
With Willie Dixon and Memphis Slim 
Willie's Blues (Bluesville, 1959)
With Ella Fitzgerald 
Ella at Juan-Les-Pins (Verve, 1964)
Ella in Rome: The Birthday Concert (Verve, 1958)
Ella in Berlin: Mack the Knife (Verve, 1960)
With Coleman Hawkins
Night Hawk (Swingville, 1960)
With Johnny Hodges
Triple Play (RCA Victor, 1967)
With Willis Jackson
Really Groovin' (Prestige, 1961)
In My Solitude (Moodsville, 1961)
With Herbie Mann
Salute to the Flute (Epic, 1957)
With Gerry Mulligan
The Gerry Mulligan Quartet (Verve, 1962)
Spring Is Sprung (Philips, 1962)
Gerry Mulligan '63 (Verve, 1963)
With Joe Newman
Salute to Satch (RCA Victor, 1956)
With Chico O'Farrill
Nine Flags (Impulse!, 1966)
With Oscar Pettiford
The Oscar Pettiford Orchestra in Hi-Fi Volume Two (ABC-Paramount, 1957)
With Al Sears
Rockin' in Rhythm (Swingville, 1960) as The Swingville All-Stars with Taft Jordan and Hilton Jefferson
With Zoot Sims
The Modern Art of Jazz by Zoot Sims (Dawn, 1956)
Tonite's Music Today (Storyvile, 1956) with Bob Brookmeyer
With Rex Stewart and Cootie Williams
The Big Challenge (Jazztone, 1957)
With Ralph Sutton and Ruby Braff
R & R (Chiaroscuro, 1979)
Remembered (DVD) (Arbors Records, 2004)
With Ralph Sutton and Jay McShann
 Last of the Whorehouse Piano Players  (Chaz Jazz, 1980) - originally released on 2 LPs as The Last of the Whorehouse Piano Players: Two Pianos Vol. I & Vol. II 
Last of the Whorehouse Piano Players (Chiaroscuro, 1989)
With Ralph Sutton and Kenny Davern
Ralph Sutton and Kenny Davern (Chiaroscuro)
With Buddy Tate
Buddy Tate and His Buddies (Chiaroscuro, 1973)
With Frank Wess
Jazz for Playboys (Savoy, 1957)
Opus de Blues (Savoy, 1959 [1984])
With Lem Winchester
Another Opus (New Jazz, 1960)
With Kai Winding
The Swingin' States (Columbia, 1958)
Solo (Verve, 1963)

References

External links
Gus Johnson Interview NAMM Oral History Library (1985)

1913 births
2000 deaths
People from Tyler, Texas
American jazz drummers
Count Basie Orchestra members
Musicians from Texas
20th-century American drummers
American male drummers
American male jazz musicians
World's Greatest Jazz Band members
20th-century American male musicians